The red-throated squirrel (Dremomys gularis) is a rodent of the family Sciuridae. This species of rodent is distributed in parts of southeastern Asia, in areas of the Red River Valley of northern Vietnam and southern central Yunnan in China. The red-throated squirrel is sympatric with another member of the same genus, D. rufigenis, but lives at higher attitudes (2500 to 3000 m in the case of the type specimen).

References

Dremomys
Rodents of China
Rodents of Vietnam
Mammals described in 1932